In mathematics, a distinguished limit is an appropriately chosen scale factor used in the method of matched asymptotic expansions.

External links
 Singular perturbation theory, Scholarpedia

Differential equations
Asymptotic analysis